The 2022–23 Wisconsin Badgers women's ice hockey season will represent the University of Wisconsin–Madison during the 2022–23 NCAA Division I women's ice hockey season.

Offseason

Recruiting

Regular season

Standings

Schedule 

|-
!colspan=12 style="  "| Regular Season

{{CIH schedule end|Notes=Source:<ref>

Roster 
Source:

References 

Wisconsin
Wisconsin Badgers women's ice hockey seasons
Wisconsin
Wisconsin
NCAA women's ice hockey Frozen Four seasons
NCAA women's ice hockey championship seasons